The 1996 Maine Black Bears football team represented the University of Maine in the 1996 NCAA Division I-AA football season. They were led by forth-year head coach Jack Cosgrove and finished the season with record of 7–4 and a 5–3 mark in the Yankee Conference.

Schedule

Roster

Team players in the NFL
No Maine players were selected in the 1997 NFL Draft.

The following finished their college career in 1996, were not drafted, but played in the NFL.

References

Maine
Maine Black Bears football seasons
Maine Black Bears football